"Lane moje" (literally "My Fawn", figuratively "My Darling") is the name of the song performed by Serbian musician Željko Joksimović at the Eurovision Song Contest 2004 for , in which it finished second. Inspired by traditional Serbian music (also called ethno), in the style of a ballad, it won in the semi-finals but ultimately lost closely to  "Wild Dances", finishing second scoring 263 points, becoming the first non-winning song in the contest, along with 's entry "Shake It", to score over 200 points. The song set a trend of world music strategy in the competition by the former Yugoslav republics.

The song has become popular amongst many Eurovision fans and it is often rated as one of the best non-winning songs.

Joksimović went on to compose Bosnia's 2006 entry, Serbia's 2008 entry, to host the 2008 Contest, to perform Serbia's 2012 entry and to compose Montenegro's 2015 entry.

Track list
 "Lane moje"
 "Good bye"
 "Lane moje (Instrumental version)"
 "Lane moje (Eastern mix by Alek)"
 "Lane moje (Trancefusion mix by Dream Team)"

Charts

References

External links
 "Lane moje"
 Official Video Clip "Lane moje"

Eurovision songs of Serbia and Montenegro
Eurovision songs of 2004
2004 singles
2004 songs
Serbian songs
2004 in Serbia and Montenegro